Daniel Nichols (born 1969) is an American Jewish rock musician and founder of the band, E18hteen.

Biography
Dan Nichols was born in 1969 in Indiana. He attended Pike Township Schools in Indianapolis. He and his parents converted to Judaism when he was 7, after his mother "went on a quest for spirituality". He attended Indianapolis Hebrew Congregation and camped at Goldman Union in Zionsville, Indiana. He lives in Raleigh, North Carolina. Dan Nichols is a proud alum of the University of North Carolina at Chapel Hill where he received a bachelor's degree in music in 1992.

Music career

In 1994, while living in Nashville, Tennessee, Nichols met Mason Cooper and created the band, Eighteen, performing rock music with Jewish themes and Hebrew prayers. Prior to Eighteen, Nichols was a member of the band Olskies. Nichols previously worked as a cantorial soloist at Congregation Micah in Brentwood, Tennessee, and also has a background in opera. Nichols performs at synagogues, Hillels, Jewish Community Centers and Jewish youth camps nationwide. His work has been recognized by the Union for Reform Judaism and NFTY who have featured him as an artist at Biennials and Conventions, and included his music on their Ruach compilation albums and songbooks. Since 2001, Nichols has been a faculty member of the annual songleading conference, Hava Nashira in Oconomowoc, Wisconsin. In 2006, NFTY awarded Nichols its highest honor, Lifetime Membership, in recognition of his years of commitment and outstanding contribution to Reform Jewish youth. In 2008, Nichols and Eighteen performed a live concert for Sirius XM's Radio Hanukkah Jewish Stars concert series, and a concert at Masada for Israel's 60th anniversary. Dan Nichols has also been Rodef Sholom's artist in residence since 2008.
Nichols is the subject of the 2013 documentary film Road to Eden: Rock & Roll Sukkot which follows Dan and his band Eighteen as they travelled in an RV across the American South during the holiday of Sukkot. In 2015, Dan released an album of acoustic music on an album called Beautiful and Broken with guest artist Elana Arian. His newest album, I Believe was released in August 2016. I Believe features cover art designed by Sarah Edelstein.

Discography

Life (1996)
The Day After Tomorrow (1997)
Be Strong (2001)
Kol HaShabbat (2002)
My Heart is in the East (2004)
The Roots (2008)
To the Mountains (2009)
The Sound of What Cannot Be Seen (2012)
Road to Eden Soundtrack (2014)
Beautiful & Broken (2015)
I Believe (2016)I Will Not Fear (2019)One Who Will Struggle: Music for Prayer (2020)What Could Go Wrong? (2021)

Compilations
Greatest Hits18 on 18 (2010)

NFTY Compilations
"L'takein (The Na Na Song)" appears on Ruach 5761"Pitchu Li" and "Kehillah Kedoshah" appear on Ruach 5763"My Heart is in the East" appears on Ruach 5765"Hashkiveinu" and "LeDor VaDor" appear on Ruach 5767"Or Chadash" and "Esai Einei" appear on Ruach 5769"Sweet as Honey" and "Hoshiah" appear on Ruach 5771"All this Rain" and "Mayim" appear on Ruach 5773"Eternity Utters a Day" appears on Ruach 5775Celebrate Series
"Kumi Lach" appears on Celebrate Jewish Love SongsCollaborationsThe Remix – EP with Alan Goodis (2015)So is Life!'' – Boxt, Dreskin, Nelson & Nichols (2016)

References 

Living people
1969 births
Jewish American musicians
Jewish American songwriters
Musicians from Raleigh, North Carolina
Musicians from Indianapolis
Jewish rock musicians
Jewish folk singers
Songwriters from Indiana